Maneater is a 2022 American horror thriller film directed by Justin Lee, starring Nicky Whelan, Shane West, Trace Adkins, Branscombe Richmond and Jeff Fahey.

Cast
 Nicky Whelan as Jessie
 Shane West as Will
 Trace Adkins as Harlan
 Branscombe Richmond as Sheriff Kua
 Jeff Fahey
 Porscha Coleman as Sunny
 Zoe Cipres as Emma
 Kelly Lynn Reiter as Brianna
 Alex Farnham as Ty
 Ed Morrone as Captain Wally
 Kim DeLonghi as Beth

Release
The film was released in theatres, on demand and digital on 26 August 2022.

Reception
John Townsend of Starburst rated the film 2 stars out of 5 and wrote that it is "One for the shark completists only." Matt Donato of IGN gave the film a rating of 3 out of 10. Jeffrey Anderson of Common Sense Media rated the film 1 star out of 5 and called it "abysmally bad".

Ian Sedensky of Culture Crypt gave the film a score of 20 out of 100, writing that "meanders well past the point of fleshing out everyone with backstories and over the border into full-on “where’s the shark already?” boredom." Matthew Monagle of the The Austin Chronicle rated the film 0.5 stars out of 5, calling it a "particularly rough watch". Noel Murray of the Los Angeles Times wrote that "By the end, “Maneater” has walked right up to the edge of being a fun, silly, “so bad it’s good” time-killer. But after taking way too long, it never really arrives there."

Matthew Mahler of MovieWeb wrote that the film "is never gripping or scary enough to ever distract from the silliness of its scenes, making it oddly more fun to put on with some friends for a laugh." Peter Martin of ScreenAnarchy called the film a "fun flick that feels like the fading rays of summer in our North American summer."

References

External links
 
 

American horror thriller films
2022 horror thriller films